Thyholm may refer to two places in Denmark:

Thyholm Municipality
Thyholm Peninsula